HLA-DQ6 (DQ6) is a human leukocyte antigen serotype within HLA-DQ (DQ) serotype group. The serotype is determined by the antibody recognition of β6 subset of DQ β-chains. The β-chain of DQ isoforms are encoded by HLA-DQB1 locus and DQ6 are encoded by the HLA-DQB1 allele group. This group currently contains many common alleles, DQB1 is the most common.  HLA-DQ6 and DQB1 are almost synonymous in meaning. DQ6 β-chains combine with α-chains, encoded by genetically linked HLA-DQA1 alleles, to form the cis-haplotype isoforms. For DQ6, however, cis-isoform pairing only occurs with DQ1 α-chains. There are many haplotypes of DQ6.

Serology

Alleles

DQB1*0601
DQB1*0601 is generally linked to DQA1*0103 as 6.1 haplotype. This haplotype is more common in Japan and other parts of East Asia.

DQB1*0602
DQB1*0602 is commonly linked to DQA1*0102 to form 6.2 haplotype. DQ6.2 and is common from Central Asia into Western Europe, *0602 is also linked to DQA1*0103 in parts of Asia.

DQB1*0603
DQB1*0603 is commonly linked to DQA1*0103 as 6.3 and is common from Central Asia into Western Europe, *0603 is also linked to DQA1*0102 in parts of Asia. In Europe it is most common in the Netherlands.

DQB1*0604
DQB1*0604 is found at higher frequencies in parts Africa and Asia and is linked almost exclusively to DQA1*0102 as 6.4. This haplotype is found at its highest Eurasian frequencies in Japan.

DQB1*0609
DQB1*0609 is found in Africa and proximal regions of Eurasia.

Haplotypes and disease
Susceptibility to Leptospirosis infection was found associated with undifferentiated DQ6. Whereas DQ6 was protective against death (or need for liver transplantion) in primary sclerosing cholangitis.

DQ6.1
DQA1*0103:DQB1*0601 (DQ6.1) is found at increased frequencies in Asia and is almost
absent in Western Europe. It confers protection from narcolepsy, juvenile diabetes, Vogt-Koyanagi-Harada (VKH) syndrome, pemphigus vulgaris, multiple sclerosis, myasthenia gravis.

DQ6.2
DQ6.2 (DQA1 : DQB1) is commonly linked to DR15 and as such is part of the HLA B7-DR15-DQ6 haplotype. This haplotype is considered to be the longest multigene haplotype known within the human genome as it covers over 4.7 million nucleotides.  The DR15-DQ6.2 haplotype is the most common DR-DQ haplotype in Europe, and approximately 30% of Americans carry at least DQ6.2. The haplotype is even more common in Central Asia.

DQ6.2 associations with disease
For myasthenia gravis, recognition α34-49 of AChR  increased with DQ6.2.  DQA1 increases risk cervical cancer. In multiple sclerosis DQA1 was the most frequent allele and DQB1 increased significantly in the MS patients.

Protective effects of DQ6.2
In primary biliary cirrhosis DQ6.2 appears to have a negative association with disease. DQ6.2 also appears to have a protective effect in juvenile diabetes. DQ6.2 is also protective against infantile spasms in mestizos.

DQ6.3
DQ6.3 (DQA1 : DQB1) is found in northcentral Europe at moderate frequencies, it is a protective against many autoimmune diseases. It also affords some protection to HIV infection.

DQ6.4
DQ6.4 (DQA1 : DQB1) might be associated with thymoma-induced myasthenia gravis.

References

6